Coachford is a village in County Cork, Ireland. It is located on the north side of the River Lee. The village is located in the civil parish of Magourney. Coachford is part of the Dáil constituency of Cork North-West.

Coachford owes its name to once being a crossing point over a stream for horse-drawn coaches, and this stream continues to flow beneath the village to the present day. The Lee was flooded for a hydroelectric power plant and farmland including many houses was flooded by the newly formed lake. Coachford is located around a crossroads where the R618 and R619 regional roads intersect.

History
Coachford does not feature on the 1811 Grand Jury Map of Cork, but is mentioned in the Freeman's Journal, dated 10 January 1822, and the area and its environs were known as "Magourney". The Village developed rapidly during the Famine (when it was a centre of relief within the mid Cork area) and subsequently. By 1888, the Cork & Muskerry Light Railway had a terminus at Coachford, adding to local business, accessibility and vibrancy. By the end of the 19th-century, the village also had a creamery, complimenting its agricultural hinterland.

By the 1950s, a Vocational School was established, known today as Coachford College (sometimes referred to as Coachford Community College). The 2011-15 Aghabullogue-Coachford-Rylane Community Council commissioned URS consultants to draw up a "Village Design Statement" (VDS) for the three villages in 2012.

Deaths during the War of Independence and Civil War 
Mrs. Mary (or Maria) Lindsay, Leemount House, Coachford, an elderly widow, was executed by the IRA (along with her driver, James Clarke), on 9 March 1921. Attempting to prevent bloodshed she, along with a Roman Catholic priest, tried to persuade members of the IRA against a planned ambush. The IRA ignored them and she then warned the British Army of a planned ambush in nearby Dripsey, for which six IRA volunteers were later executed. She and her driver were shot and her home, Leemount House, burned down, after the British authorities refused to commute the executions of the six IRA volunteers. A character ("Lady Fitzhugh") based on Mrs. Lindsay was played by Dame Sybil Thorndike in the 1959 film, Shake Hands with the Devil, which starred James Cagney, Don Murray and Michael Redgrave. An IRA man named Frank Busteed later claimed credit for the killings and for burning down Mrs. Lindsay's home.

Near Rooves Bridge is a monument to Captain Tadhg Kennefick of the Irish Republican Army, who was killed during the Irish Civil War by the Free State Army. On his way home to his mother's funeral, he was stopped at a checkpoint where Free State soldiers tied him to the back of a truck near a hamlet called Peake and dragged him a distance of four miles (6 km) to the bridge where he was shot by soldiers and his body dumped in a ditch. Local people who witnessed this recovered his body. A monument now stands on the site where his body was recovered.

Sites
Close to Coachford is Mullinhassig Waterfall.
Rooves Bridge is the longest bridge spanning the River Lee.

Sport and community
The village is the home of Aghabullogue GAA, best known for capturing Cork's first hurling All-Ireland title in 1890 when they defeated Castlebridge, Wexford in the final.

A local amateur drama group, the Coachford Players, was established in 1987 and performs a full-length play each year.

Education

The village and its environs are served by Coachford National School and Coachford College. The latter is a co-educational secondary school which, as of 2017, had an enrollment of over 610 students. An extension was completed in 2002 and provided the college with a sports hall. In October 2020, funding was allocated for the extension and refurbishment of facilities at Coachford College.

Transport
Coachford was formerly connected by railway to Cork City with a narrow gauge railway, opened in 1888 by the Cork and Muskerry Light Railway. The line was closed in 1934 by the GSR. Coachford railway station opened on 19 March 1888, but finally closed on 31 December 1934.

See also
 List of towns and villages in Ireland

References

External links
 Coachford Community Association online

Towns and villages in County Cork